Theerathon Bunmathan (born 6 March 1990), simply known as Aum, is a Thai professional footballer who plays as a left back for Buriram United and captains the Thailand national team. He has also been used as a midfielder and is the first Thai player to win the J1 League.

Club career

Domestic careers
Theerathon started almost every match for Buriram United due to his superb and consistent form. Theerathon is a major part of Buriram United's success; his free kicks assisted and scored many goals for the club. His free kick against FC Seoul in the 2013 AFC Champions League qualified Buriram to the knockout phase. In the 2013 Thai Premier League Theerathon scored 3 goals against BEC Tero Sasana, Chonburi, and Ratchaburi Mitr Phol.
 
In May 2016 it was announced that after spending six years with Buriram United he would be joining arch rivals Muangthong United the following month on a five-year contract for an all-time record for the highest football transfer fee for Thai League 1 at 35 million Baht. That record was soon broken on 2 November 2016 by Tanaboon Kesarat. The transfer fee is undisclosed but it is estimated to be around 50 million Baht.

Vissel Kobe

In 2018 Theerathon was on loan to play in the J.League for one season with the club Vissel Kobe in the 2018 season, which gives Theerathon the opportunity to play with world-class footballers such as Lucas Podolski, David Villa, and Andres Iniesta.

Yokohama F. Marinos

In January 2019, Yokohama F. Marinos reached an agreement on loan to Theerathon from Muangthong United to play in the J.League season 2019. Hereafter, in March 2019, Theeraton started his first league match for the club in the match in which Yokohama opened the home match against former rival Kawasaki Frontale with scores 2–2.

Later, in July 2019 Theerathon was named the J.League's Best Team of the Week after which he helped the team to beat Vissel Kobe, his former team with a score of 2–0. On 31 August 2019, Theerathon scored the first goal in the league and in the name of the club helped Yokohama open their home defeat to Gamba Osaka with a score of 3–1 and on 7 December 2019, the season-ending match of J.League Theerathon scored 1 goal and assists, helping Yokohama opens the house 3–0 defeat to FC Tokyo became the first Thai player to be champions of the J.League.

In December 2019, Theerathon signed a permanent contract with Yokohama F. Marinos, making him a permanent Yokohama F. Marinos player from December 2019. At the end of season 2020, Theerathon has been selected from the International Federation of Football History & Statistics (IFFHS) to be the first XI in AFC men team of the year 2020 alongside Takumi Minamino, Son Heung-min and Sardar Azmoun and is the only player in Southeast Asia in this best XI.

Buriram United
In December 2021, Theerathon rejoined his former club Buriram United.

Personal life
On 24 May 2016, Theerathon married Chatrakamol Muangman in a traditional ceremony. The wedding was attended by many teammates and staff from the teams for which Theerathon had played.

Career statistics

Club

International career
Theerathon played against Saudi Arabia in the 2014 FIFA World Cup qualification and received a red card in the 90th minute. After that match he went to Indonesia to play for Thailand U-23 in the 2011 Southeast Asian Games. He was Thailand U-23's starter and received an early yellow card, followed by a second one a few minutes after which resulted in a red card, thus becoming the first player in Thai football to get two red cards in three days.

Theerathon's scored a penalty in a friendly match against Laos. His second international goal is a rebound from Jakkraphan Pornsai's free kick. His form in the 2012 AFF Suzuki Cup is very impressive combined with Anucha Kitpongsri who played on the left side of the field.

He represented Thailand U-23 at the 2013 Southeast Asian Games, and is selected as captain for the tournament.

In May 2015, he captained Thailand to play in the 2018 FIFA World Cup qualification against Vietnam.

International goals

Under-23

International goals
Scores and results list Thailand's goal tally first.

Honours

Buriram United
 Thai League 1: 2011, 2013, 2014, 2015, 2021–22
 Thai FA Cup: 2011, 2012, 2013, 2015, 2021–22
 Thai League Cup: 2011, 2012, 2013, 2015, 2021–22
 Toyota Premier Cup: 2012, 2014, 2016
 Kor Royal Cup: 2013, 2014, 2015, 2016
 Mekong Club Championship: 2015

Muangthong United
 Thai League 1: 2016
 Thai League Cup: 2016, 2017
 Thailand Champions Cup: 2017
 Mekong Club Championship: 2017

Yokohama F. Marinos
 J1 League: 2019

Thailand U-23
 Sea Games  Gold Medal: 2013

Thailand
 AFF Championship: 2016, 2020, 2022
 King's Cup: 2016, 2017

Individual
 AFF Championship Most Valuable Player: 2022
AFF Championship Best XI: 2022
 AFF Championship Best XI: 2012
 ASEAN Football Federation Best XI: 2013
 Thai Premier League/Thai League 1 Player of the Month: October 2013, February 2022
 AFC Champions League Dream Team: 2013
 Thai Premier League Player of the Year: 2013
 Thai League 1 Player of the Year: 2021–22
 IFFHS AFC Man Team of the Year: 2020
 IFFHS AFC Men's Team of the Decade 2011–2020

Royal decoration 
 2015 –  Silver Medalist (Seventh Class) of The Most Admirable Order of the Direkgunabhorn

References

External links
 Theerathon Bunmathan profile at Muangthong United website

1990 births
Living people
Theerathon Bunmathan
Theerathon Bunmathan
Association football fullbacks
Theerathon Bunmathan
Theerathon Bunmathan
Theerathon Bunmathan
J1 League players
Theerathon Bunmathan
Theerathon Bunmathan
Theerathon Bunmathan
Theerathon Bunmathan
Theerathon Bunmathan
Footballers at the 2010 Asian Games
Theerathon Bunmathan
Southeast Asian Games medalists in football
2019 AFC Asian Cup players
Vissel Kobe players
Yokohama F. Marinos players
Competitors at the 2013 Southeast Asian Games
Theerathon Bunmathan